The June 2006 San Francisco general elections were held on June 6, 2006, in San Francisco, California. The elections included one seat to the San Francisco County Superior Court and four San Francisco ballot measures.

Superior Court 
Incumbent judge Lillian K. Sing won reelection.

Propositions 
Note: "City" refers to the San Francisco municipal government.

Proposition A 

Proposition A would allocate $10 million from the City's General Fund for the next three fiscal years for violence prevention and intervention services, to establish a Homicide Prevention Planning Council to develop and annually revise a Homicide Prevention Plan, and to create the position of Survivors' Advocate and a Survivors' Fund under the auspices of the District Attorney.

Proposition B 

Proposition B would require landlords to, before offering to sell buildings of two or more residential units, disclose to all potential buyers the specific legal grounds for any evictions resulting in vacant lots at the time of sale, and to disclose whether the tenants were elderly or disabled.

Proposition C 

Proposition C would change the City's appointment process to the Transbay Joint Powers Authority by designating the Mayor and two members of the Board of Supervisors to represent the City.

Proposition D 

Proposition D would create the Laguna Honda Hospital Special Use District encompassing the Laguna Honda Hospital and Rehabilitation Center, limit the patients who can receive care at Laguna Honda Hospital and certain other facilities, and allow privately owned residential health care facilities to operate in "public" districts.

External links 
 San Francisco Department of Elections

San Francisco 06
2005 06
Elections 06
San Francisco 06
Elections 2006 06